Angi Vera  is a 1978 Hungarian drama film directed by Pál Gábor and starring Vera Pap. It was selected as the Hungarian entry for the Best Foreign Language Film at the 52nd Academy Awards, but was not accepted as a nominee.

Vera Angi (Vera Pap) is an employee of a hospital in post-WWII Hungary.  She complains to her superiors about the unsanitary conditions in the hospital. As her proletarian background fits in nicely with the new doctrine of the communist regime, she is sent to a six-month education course. While in the school, she falls in love with the teacher István André (Tamás Dunai), while informers make conditions difficult for the students.

Cast
 Vera Pap - Vera Angi (as Pap Veronika)
 Erzsi Pásztor - Anna Traján
 Éva Szabó - Mária Muskát
 Tamás Dunai - István André
 László Halász - Sas elvtárs
 László Horváth - József Neubauer
 Flóra Kádár - Mrs. János Mikus

See also
 List of submissions to the 52nd Academy Awards for Best Foreign Language Film
 List of Hungarian submissions for the Academy Award for Best Foreign Language Film

References

External links
 

1978 films
1978 drama films
1970s Hungarian-language films
Films directed by Pál Gábor
Hungarian drama films